Iberian moths represent about 4,454 different types of moths. The moths (mostly nocturnal) and butterflies (mostly diurnal) together make up the taxonomic order Lepidoptera.

This is a list of moth species which have been recorded in Portugal, Spain and Gibraltar (together forming the Iberian Peninsula). This list also includes species found on the Balearic Islands.

Gelechiidae
Acompsia antirrhinella Milliere, 1866
Acompsia cinerella (Clerck, 1759)
Acompsia dimorpha Petry, 1904
Acompsia pyrenaella Huemer & Karsholt, 2002
Acompsia tripunctella (Denis & Schiffermuller, 1775)
Acompsia schmidtiellus (Heyden, 1848)
Altenia scriptella (Hübner, 1796)
Anacampsis obscurella (Denis & Schiffermuller, 1775)
Anacampsis populella (Clerck, 1759)
Anacampsis scintillella (Fischer von Röslerstamm, 1841)
Anacampsis timidella (Wocke, 1887)
Anarsia bilbainella (Rossler, 1877)
Anarsia lineatella Zeller, 1839
Anarsia spartiella (Schrank, 1802)
Apatetris agenjoi Gozmany, 1954
Apodia bifractella (Duponchel, 1843)
Aponoea obtusipalpis Walsingham, 1905
Aproaerema anthyllidella (Hübner, 1813)
Aproaerema lerauti Vives, 2001
Aristotelia brizella (Treitschke, 1833)
Aristotelia decoratella (Staudinger, 1879)
Aristotelia decurtella (Hübner, 1813)
Aristotelia ericinella (Zeller, 1839)
Aristotelia frankeniae Walsingham, 1898
Aristotelia mirabilis (Christoph, 1888)
Aristotelia montarcella A. Schmidt, 1941
Aristotelia staticella Milliere, 1876
Aristotelia subdecurtella (Stainton, 1859)
Aristotelia subericinella (Duponchel, 1843)
Aroga aristotelis (Milliere, 1876)
Aroga flavicomella (Zeller, 1839)
Aroga pascuicola (Staudinger, 1871)
Aroga temporariella Sattler, 1960
Aroga velocella (Duponchel, 1838)
Athrips amoenella (Frey, 1882)
Athrips rancidella (Herrich-Schäffer, 1854)
Athrips thymifoliella (Constant, 1893)
Brachmia blandella (Fabricius, 1798)
Brachmia dimidiella (Denis & Schiffermuller, 1775)
Bryotropha affinis (Haworth, 1828)
Bryotropha aliterrella (Rebel, 1935)
Bryotropha arabica Amsel, 1952
Bryotropha basaltinella (Zeller, 1839)
Bryotropha desertella (Douglas, 1850)
Bryotropha domestica (Haworth, 1828)
Bryotropha dryadella (Zeller, 1850)
Bryotropha figulella (Staudinger, 1859)
Bryotropha gallurella Amsel, 1952
Bryotropha heckfordi Karsholt & Rutten, 2005
Bryotropha pallorella Amsel, 1952
Bryotropha plebejella (Zeller, 1847)
Bryotropha sattleri Nel, 2003
Bryotropha senectella (Zeller, 1839)
Bryotropha sutteri Karsholt & Rutten, 2005
Bryotropha terrella (Denis & Schiffermuller, 1775)
Bryotropha umbrosella (Zeller, 1839)
Bryotropha vondermuhlli Nel & Brusseaux, 2003
Bryotropha wolschrijni Karsholt & Rutten, 2005
Carpatolechia alburnella (Zeller, 1839)
Carpatolechia decorella (Haworth, 1812)
Carpatolechia fugacella (Zeller, 1839)
Carpatolechia fugitivella (Zeller, 1839)
Carpatolechia intermediella Huemer & Karsholt, 1999
Caryocolum alsinella (Zeller, 1868)
Caryocolum arenbergeri Huemer, 1989
Caryocolum blandella (Douglas, 1852)
Caryocolum blandelloides Karsholt, 1981
Caryocolum blandulella (Tutt, 1887)
Caryocolum cauligenella (Schmid, 1863)
Caryocolum fibigerium Huemer, 1988
Caryocolum fraternella (Douglas, 1851)
Caryocolum hispanicum Huemer, 1988
Caryocolum jaspidella (Chretien, 1908)
Caryocolum leucofasciatum Huemer, 1989
Caryocolum leucomelanella (Zeller, 1839)
Caryocolum marmorea (Haworth, 1828)
Caryocolum mucronatella (Chretien, 1900)
Caryocolum peregrinella (Herrich-Schäffer, 1854)
Caryocolum provinciella (Stainton, 1869)
Caryocolum proxima (Haworth, 1828)
Caryocolum repentis Huemer & Luquet, 1992
Caryocolum schleichi (Christoph, 1872)
Caryocolum tischeriella (Zeller, 1839)
Caryocolum tricolorella (Haworth, 1812)
Caryocolum vicinella (Douglas, 1851)
Caulastrocecis pudicellus (Mann, 1861)
Chionodes bastuliella (Rebel, 1931)
Chionodes distinctella (Zeller, 1839)
Chionodes fumatella (Douglas, 1850)
Chionodes hinnella (Rebel, 1935)
Chrysoesthia drurella (Fabricius, 1775)
Chrysoesthia gaditella (Staudinger, 1859)
Chrysoesthia sexguttella (Thunberg, 1794)
Coloptilia conchylidella (O. Hofmann, 1898)
Cosmardia moritzella (Treitschke, 1835)
Crossobela trinotella (Herrich-Schäffer, 1856)
Dactylotula altithermella (Walsingham, 1903)
Deltophora gielisia Hull, 1995
Deltophora stictella (Rebel, 1927)
Dichomeris acuminatus (Staudinger, 1876)
Dichomeris alacella (Zeller, 1839)
Dichomeris castellana (A. Schmidt, 1941)
Dichomeris cisti (Staudinger, 1859)
Dichomeris helianthemi (Walsingham, 1903)
Dichomeris juniperella (Linnaeus, 1761)
Dichomeris lamprostoma (Zeller, 1847)
Dichomeris limbipunctellus (Staudinger, 1859)
Dichomeris marginella (Fabricius, 1781)
Dichomeris rasilella (Herrich-Schäffer, 1854)
Ephysteris diminutella (Zeller, 1847)
Ephysteris iberica Povolny, 1977
Ephysteris inustella (Zeller, 1847)
Ephysteris promptella (Staudinger, 1859)
Epidola barcinonella Milliere, 1867
Epidola stigma Staudinger, 1859
Eulamprotes atrella (Denis & Schiffermuller, 1775)
Eulamprotes helotella (Staudinger, 1859)
Eulamprotes immaculatella (Douglas, 1850)
Eulamprotes libertinella (Zeller, 1872)
Eulamprotes nigromaculella (Milliere, 1872)
Eulamprotes unicolorella (Duponchel, 1843)
Eulamprotes wilkella (Linnaeus, 1758)
Exoteleia dodecella (Linnaeus, 1758)
Filatima spurcella (Duponchel, 1843)
Filatima textorella (Chretien, 1908)
Gelechia atlanticella (Amsel, 1955)
Gelechia mediterranea Huemer, 1991
Gelechia nervosella (Zerny, 1927)
Gelechia rhombella (Denis & Schiffermuller, 1775)
Gelechia sabinellus (Zeller, 1839)
Gelechia scotinella Herrich-Schäffer, 1854
Gelechia senticetella (Staudinger, 1859)
Gelechia sororculella (Hübner, 1817)
Gelechia turpella (Denis & Schiffermuller, 1775)
Gladiovalva aizpuruai Vives, 1990
Gladiovalva badidorsella (Rebel, 1935)
Gladiovalva rumicivorella (Milliere, 1881)
Gnorimoschema epithymella (Staudinger, 1859)
Gnorimoschema herbichii (Nowicki, 1864)
Gnorimoschema soffneri Riedl, 1965
Gnorimoschema valesiella (Staudinger, 1877)
Helcystogramma lutatella (Herrich-Schäffer, 1854)
Helcystogramma rufescens (Haworth, 1828)
Helcystogramma triannulella (Herrich-Schäffer, 1854)
Isophrictis anthemidella (Wocke, 1871)
Isophrictis cerdanica Nel, 1995
Isophrictis constantina (Baker, 1888)
Isophrictis corsicella Amsel, 1936
Isophrictis impugnata Gozmany, 1957
Isophrictis kefersteiniellus (Zeller, 1850)
Isophrictis lineatellus (Zeller, 1850)
Isophrictis meridionella (Herrich-Schäffer, 1854)
Isophrictis microlina Meyrick, 1935
Isophrictis striatella (Denis & Schiffermuller, 1775)
Istrianis myricariella (Frey, 1870)
Iwaruna biguttella (Duponchel, 1843)
Klimeschiopsis terroris (Hartig, 1938)
Megacraspedus alfacarellus Wehrli, 1926
Megacraspedus binotella (Duponchel, 1843)
Megacraspedus cuencellus Caradja, 1920
Megacraspedus dejectella (Staudinger, 1859)
Megacraspedus dolosellus (Zeller, 1839)
Megacraspedus escalerellus A. Schmidt, 1941
Megacraspedus fallax (Mann, 1867)
Megacraspedus grossisquammellus Chretien, 1925
Megacraspedus lanceolellus (Zeller, 1850)
Megacraspedus pusillus Walsingham, 1903
Megacraspedus separatellus (Fischer von Röslerstamm, 1843)
Megacraspedus squalida Meyrick, 1926
Megacraspedus subdolellus Staudinger, 1859
Mesophleps corsicella Herrich-Schäffer, 1856
Mesophleps ochracella (Turati, 1926)
Mesophleps oxycedrella (Milliere, 1871)
Mesophleps silacella (Hübner, 1796)
Metanarsia incertella (Herrich-Schäffer, 1861)
Metzneria aestivella (Zeller, 1839)
Metzneria agraphella (Ragonot, 1895)
Metzneria aprilella (Herrich-Schäffer, 1854)
Metzneria artificella (Herrich-Schäffer, 1861)
Metzneria campicolella (Mann, 1857)
Metzneria castiliella (Moschler, 1866)
Metzneria diffusella Englert, 1974
Metzneria ehikeella Gozmany, 1954
Metzneria expositoi Vives, 2001
Metzneria hilarella Caradja, 1920
Metzneria intestinella (Mann, 1864)
Metzneria lappella (Linnaeus, 1758)
Metzneria littorella (Douglas, 1850)
Metzneria metzneriella (Stainton, 1851)
Metzneria neuropterella (Zeller, 1839)
Metzneria paucipunctella (Zeller, 1839)
Metzneria riadella Englert, 1974
Metzneria santolinella (Amsel, 1936)
Metzneria staehelinella Englert, 1974
Metzneria subflavella Englert, 1974
Metzneria tenuiella (Mann, 1864)
Metzneria torosulella (Rebel, 1893)
Metzneria tristella Rebel, 1901
Microlechia chretieni Turati, 1924
Mirificarma cabezella (Chretien, 1925)
Mirificarma cytisella (Treitschke, 1833)
Mirificarma denotata Pitkin, 1984
Mirificarma eburnella (Denis & Schiffermuller, 1775)
Mirificarma fasciata Pitkin, 1984
Mirificarma flavella (Duponchel, 1844)
Mirificarma interrupta (Curtis, 1827)
Mirificarma lentiginosella (Zeller, 1839)
Mirificarma maculatella (Hübner, 1796)
Mirificarma mulinella (Zeller, 1839)
Mirificarma pederskoui Huemer & Karsholt, 1999
Mirificarma ulicinella (Staudinger, 1859)
Monochroa cytisella (Curtis, 1837)
Monochroa hornigi (Staudinger, 1883)
Monochroa lucidella (Stephens, 1834)
Monochroa melagonella (Constant, 1895)
Monochroa moyses Uffen, 1991
Monochroa nomadella (Zeller, 1868)
Monochroa rumicetella (O. Hofmann, 1868)
Monochroa servella (Zeller, 1839)
Monochroa tenebrella (Hübner, 1817)
Neofaculta ericetella (Geyer, 1832)
Neofaculta infernella (Herrich-Schäffer, 1854)
Neofriseria baungaardiella Huemer & Karsholt, 1999
Neofriseria peliella (Treitschke, 1835)
Neofriseria pseudoterrella (Rebel, 1928)
Neofriseria singula (Staudinger, 1876)
Neotelphusa cisti (Stainton, 1869)
Neotelphusa huemeri Nel, 1998
Neotelphusa sequax (Haworth, 1828)
Neotelphusa traugotti Huemer & Karsholt, 2001
Nothris congressariella (Bruand, 1858)
Nothris verbascella (Denis & Schiffermuller, 1775)
Ochrodia subdiminutella (Stainton, 1867)
Ornativalva heluanensis (Debski, 1913)
Ornativalva plutelliformis (Staudinger, 1859)
Ornativalva pseudotamaricella Sattler, 1967
Palumbina guerinii (Stainton, 1858)
Paranarsia joannisiella Ragonot, 1895
Parastenolechia nigrinotella (Zeller, 1847)
Pectinophora gossypiella (Saunders, 1844)
Pexicopia malvella (Hübner, 1805)
Phthorimaea operculella (Zeller, 1873)
Platyedra subcinerea (Haworth, 1828)
Pogochaetia solitaria Staudinger, 1879
Prolita sexpunctella (Fabricius, 1794)
Prolita solutella (Zeller, 1839)
Pseudosophronia cosmella Constant, 1885
Pseudosophronia exustellus (Zeller, 1847)
Pseudotelphusa occidentella Huemer & Karsholt, 1999
Pseudotelphusa paripunctella (Thunberg, 1794)
Pseudotelphusa scalella (Scopoli, 1763)
Pseudotelphusa tessella (Linnaeus, 1758)
Psoricoptera gibbosella (Zeller, 1839)
Ptocheuusa abnormella (Herrich-Schäffer, 1854)
Ptocheuusa asterisci (Walsingham, 1903)
Ptocheuusa paupella (Zeller, 1847)
Ptocheuusa scholastica (Walsingham, 1903)
Pyncostola bohemiella (Nickerl, 1864)
Recurvaria leucatella (Clerck, 1759)
Recurvaria nanella (Denis & Schiffermuller, 1775)
Recurvaria thomeriella (Chretien, 1901)
Sattleria arcuata Pitkin & Sattler, 1991
Sattleria pyrenaica (Petry, 1904)
Schistophila laurocistella Chretien, 1899
Scrobipalpa acuminatella (Sircom, 1850)
Scrobipalpa algeriensis Povolny & Bradley, 1964
Scrobipalpa amseli Povolny, 1966
Scrobipalpa artemisiella (Treitschke, 1833)
Scrobipalpa atriplicella (Fischer von Röslerstamm, 1841)
Scrobipalpa bazae Povolny, 1977
Scrobipalpa bigoti Povolny, 1973
Scrobipalpa bradleyi Povolny, 1971
Scrobipalpa camphorosmella Nel, 1999
Scrobipalpa corleyi Huemer & Karsholt, 2010
Scrobipalpa costella (Humphreys & Westwood, 1845)
Scrobipalpa disjectella (Staudinger, 1859)
Scrobipalpa divisella (Rebel, 1936)
Scrobipalpa ergasima (Meyrick, 1916)
Scrobipalpa gallicella (Constant, 1885)
Scrobipalpa halymella (Milliere, 1864)
Scrobipalpa heretica Povolny, 1973
Scrobipalpa hyoscyamella (Stainton, 1869)
Scrobipalpa instabilella (Douglas, 1846)
Scrobipalpa nitentella (Fuchs, 1902)
Scrobipalpa niveifacies Povolny, 1977
Scrobipalpa obsoletella (Fischer von Röslerstamm, 1841)
Scrobipalpa ocellatella (Boyd, 1858)
Scrobipalpa pauperella (Heinemann, 1870)
Scrobipalpa phagnalella (Constant, 1895)
Scrobipalpa portosanctana (Stainton, 1859)
Scrobipalpa postulatella Huemer & Karsholt, 2010
Scrobipalpa proclivella (Fuchs, 1886)
Scrobipalpa salinella (Zeller, 1847)
Scrobipalpa samadensis (Pfaffenzeller, 1870)
Scrobipalpa smithi Povolny & Bradley, 1964
Scrobipalpa stabilis Povolny, 1977
Scrobipalpa suaedella (Richardson, 1893)
Scrobipalpa suaedicola (Mabille, 1906)
Scrobipalpa suaedivorella (Chretien, 1915)
Scrobipalpa suasella (Constant, 1895)
Scrobipalpa superstes Povolny, 1977
Scrobipalpa traganella (Chretien, 1915)
Scrobipalpa vasconiella (Rossler, 1877)
Scrobipalpa vicaria (Meyrick, 1921)
Scrobipalpa voltinella (Chretien, 1898)
Scrobipalpa wiltshirei Povolny, 1966
Scrobipalpula psilella (Herrich-Schäffer, 1854)
Sitotroga cerealella (Olivier, 1789)
Sophronia chilonella (Treitschke, 1833)
Sophronia grandii M. Hering, 1933
Sophronia humerella (Denis & Schiffermuller, 1775)
Sophronia santolinae Staudinger, 1863
Sophronia semicostella (Hübner, 1813)
Sophronia sicariellus (Zeller, 1839)
Stenolechia gemmella (Linnaeus, 1758)
Stomopteryx basalis (Staudinger, 1876)
Stomopteryx detersella (Zeller, 1847)
Stomopteryx deverrae (Walsingham, 1905)
Stomopteryx flavipalpella Jackh, 1959
Stomopteryx flavoclavella Zerny, 1935
Stomopteryx nugatricella Rebel, 1893
Stomopteryx remissella (Zeller, 1847)
Streyella anguinella (Herrich-Schäffer, 1861)
Syncopacma albipalpella (Herrich-Schäffer, 1854)
Syncopacma captivella (Herrich-Schäffer, 1854)
Syncopacma cinctella (Clerck, 1759)
Syncopacma cincticulella (Bruand, 1851)
Syncopacma coronillella (Treitschke, 1833)
Syncopacma larseniella Gozmany, 1957
Syncopacma patruella (Mann, 1857)
Syncopacma polychromella (Rebel, 1902)
Syncopacma sangiella (Stainton, 1863)
Syncopacma suecicella (Wolff, 1958)
Syncopacma taeniolella (Zeller, 1839)
Teleiodes albidorsella Huemer & Karsholt, 1999
Teleiodes brevivalva Huemer, 1992
Teleiodes italica Huemer, 1992
Teleiodes luculella (Hübner, 1813)
Teleiodes vulgella (Denis & Schiffermuller, 1775)
Teleiodes wagae (Nowicki, 1860)
Teleiopsis albifemorella (E. Hofmann, 1867)
Teleiopsis bagriotella (Duponchel, 1840)
Teleiopsis diffinis (Haworth, 1828)
Telphusa cistiflorella (Constant, 1890)
Thiotricha subocellea (Stephens, 1834)
Tuta absoluta (Meyrick, 1917)
Vadenia ribbeella (Caradja, 1920)
Xenolechia aethiops (Humphreys & Westwood, 1845)

Geometridae
Abraxas grossulariata (Linnaeus, 1758)
Abraxas pantaria (Linnaeus, 1767)
Abraxas sylvata (Scopoli, 1763)
Acanthovalva inconspicuaria (Hübner, 1819)
Acasis viretata (Hübner, 1799)
Adactylotis contaminaria (Hübner, 1813)
Adactylotis gesticularia (Hübner, 1817)
Adalbertia castiliaria (Staudinger, 1900)
Aethalura punctulata (Denis & Schiffermuller, 1775)
Afriberina tenietaria (Staudinger, 1900)
Afriberina terraria (A. Bang-Haas, 1907)
Agriopis aurantiaria (Hübner, 1799)
Agriopis bajaria (Denis & Schiffermuller, 1775)
Agriopis leucophaearia (Denis & Schiffermuller, 1775)
Agriopis marginaria (Fabricius, 1776)
Alcis jubata (Thunberg, 1788)
Alcis repandata (Linnaeus, 1758)
Aleucis distinctata (Herrich-Schäffer, 1839)
Almeria kalischata (Staudinger, 1870)
Alsophila aceraria (Denis & Schiffermuller, 1775)
Alsophila aescularia (Denis & Schiffermuller, 1775)
Amygdaloptera testaria (Fabricius, 1794)
Angerona prunaria (Linnaeus, 1758)
Anthometra plumularia Boisduval, 1840
Anticlea derivata (Denis & Schiffermuller, 1775)
Anticollix sparsata (Treitschke, 1828)
Antilurga alhambrata (Staudinger, 1859)
Apeira syringaria (Linnaeus, 1758)
Aplasta ononaria (Fuessly, 1783)
Aplocera bohatschi (Pungeler, 1914)
Aplocera efformata (Guenee, 1858)
Aplocera plagiata (Linnaeus, 1758)
Aplocera praeformata (Hübner, 1826)
Aplocera vivesi Exposito Hermosa, 1998
Apocheima hispidaria (Denis & Schiffermuller, 1775)
Apochima flabellaria (Heeger, 1838)
Archiearis parthenias (Linnaeus, 1761)
Ascotis selenaria (Denis & Schiffermuller, 1775)
Aspitates gilvaria (Denis & Schiffermuller, 1775)
Aspitates ochrearia (Rossi, 1794)
Asthena albulata (Hufnagel, 1767)
Asthena lacturaria (Herrich-Schäffer, 1855)
Athroolopha pennigeraria (Hübner, 1813)
Baptria tibiale (Esper, 1791)
Biston betularia (Linnaeus, 1758)
Biston strataria (Hufnagel, 1767)
Boudinotiana notha (Hübner, 1803)
Boudinotiana touranginii (Berce, 1870)
Brachyglossina hispanaria (Pungeler, 1913)
Bupalus piniaria (Linnaeus, 1758)
Bustilloxia saturata (A. Bang-Haas, 1906)
Cabera exanthemata (Scopoli, 1763)
Cabera pusaria (Linnaeus, 1758)
Calamodes occitanaria (Duponchel, 1829)
Campaea honoraria (Denis & Schiffermuller, 1775)
Campaea margaritaria (Linnaeus, 1761)
Camptogramma bilineata (Linnaeus, 1758)
Casilda consecraria (Staudinger, 1871)
Cataclysme dissimilata (Rambur, 1833)
Cataclysme riguata (Hübner, 1813)
Cataclysme uniformata (Bellier, 1862)
Catarhoe basochesiata (Duponchel, 1831)
Catarhoe cuculata (Hufnagel, 1767)
Catarhoe mazeli Viidalepp, 2008
Catarhoe rubidata (Denis & Schiffermuller, 1775)
Cepphis advenaria (Hübner, 1790)
Charissa obscurata (Denis & Schiffermuller, 1775)
Charissa avilarius (Reisser, 1936)
Charissa crenulata (Staudinger, 1871)
Charissa pullata (Denis & Schiffermuller, 1775)
Charissa assoi (Redondo & Gaston, 1997)
Charissa mucidaria (Hübner, 1799)
Charissa variegata (Duponchel, 1830)
Charissa ambiguata (Duponchel, 1830)
Charissa predotae (Schawerda, 1929)
Charissa glaucinaria (Hübner, 1799)
Chemerina caliginearia (Rambur, 1833)
Chesias isabella Schawerda, 1915
Chesias legatella (Denis & Schiffermuller, 1775)
Chesias rufata (Fabricius, 1775)
Chiasmia aestimaria (Hübner, 1809)
Chiasmia clathrata (Linnaeus, 1758)
Chlorissa cloraria (Hübner, 1813)
Chlorissa viridata (Linnaeus, 1758)
Chloroclysta miata (Linnaeus, 1758)
Chloroclysta siterata (Hufnagel, 1767)
Chloroclystis v-ata (Haworth, 1809)
Cidaria fulvata (Forster, 1771)
Cinglis humifusaria (Eversmann, 1837)
Cleora cinctaria (Denis & Schiffermuller, 1775)
Cleorodes lichenaria (Hufnagel, 1767)
Cleta filacearia (Herrich-Schäffer, 1847)
Cleta ramosaria (de Villers, 1789)
Coenocalpe lapidata (Hübner, 1809)
Coenocalpe millierata (Staudinger, 1901)
Coenotephria ablutaria (Boisduval, 1840)
Coenotephria salicata (Denis & Schiffermuller, 1775)
Coenotephria tophaceata (Denis & Schiffermuller, 1775)
Colostygia aptata (Hübner, 1813)
Colostygia aqueata (Hübner, 1813)
Colostygia hilariata (Pinker, 1954)
Colostygia multistrigaria (Haworth, 1809)
Colostygia olivata (Denis & Schiffermuller, 1775)
Colostygia pectinataria (Knoch, 1781)
Colostygia turbata (Hübner, 1799)
Colotois pennaria (Linnaeus, 1761)
Comibaena bajularia (Denis & Schiffermuller, 1775)
Comibaena pseudoneriaria Wehrli, 1926
Compsoptera caesaraugustanus Redondo, 1995
Compsoptera jourdanaria (Serres, 1826)
Compsoptera opacaria (Hübner, 1819)
Cosmorhoe ocellata (Linnaeus, 1758)
Costaconvexa polygrammata (Borkhausen, 1794)
Crocallis albarracina Wehrli, 1940
Crocallis auberti Oberthur, 1883
Crocallis dardoinaria Donzel, 1840
Crocallis elinguaria (Linnaeus, 1758)
Crocallis tusciaria (Borkhausen, 1793)
Crocota peletieraria (Duponchel, 1830)
Cyclophora hyponoea (Prout, 1935)
Cyclophora linearia (Hübner, 1799)
Cyclophora porata (Linnaeus, 1767)
Cyclophora punctaria (Linnaeus, 1758)
Cyclophora suppunctaria (Zeller, 1847)
Cyclophora albiocellaria (Hübner, 1789)
Cyclophora albipunctata (Hufnagel, 1767)
Cyclophora annularia (Fabricius, 1775)
Cyclophora pendularia (Clerck, 1759)
Cyclophora puppillaria (Hübner, 1799)
Cyclophora quercimontaria (Bastelberger, 1897)
Cyclophora ruficiliaria (Herrich-Schäffer, 1855)
Cyclophora serveti Redondo & Gaston, 1999
Dasypteroma thaumasia Staudinger, 1892
Deileptenia ribeata (Clerck, 1759)
Digrammia rippertaria (Duponchel, 1830)
Dyscia fagaria (Thunberg, 1784)
Dyscia penulataria (Hübner, 1819)
Dyscia distinctaria (A. Bang-Haas, 1910)
Dyscia lentiscaria (Donzel, 1837)
Dysstroma citrata (Linnaeus, 1761)
Dysstroma truncata (Hufnagel, 1767)
Earophila badiata (Denis & Schiffermuller, 1775)
Ecleora solieraria (Rambur, 1834)
Ecliptopera capitata (Herrich-Schäffer, 1839)
Ecliptopera silaceata (Denis & Schiffermuller, 1775)
Ectropis crepuscularia (Denis & Schiffermuller, 1775)
Ekboarmia atlanticaria (Staudinger, 1859)
Ekboarmia fascinataria (Staudinger, 1900)
Ekboarmia sagnesi Dufay, 1979
Electrophaes corylata (Thunberg, 1792)
Elophos caelibaria (Heydenreich, 1851)
Elophos unicoloraria (Staudinger, 1871)
Elophos dilucidaria (Denis & Schiffermuller, 1775)
Elophos dognini (Thierry-Mieg, 1910)
Ematurga atomaria (Linnaeus, 1758)
Ennomos alniaria (Linnaeus, 1758)
Ennomos autumnaria (Werneburg, 1859)
Ennomos erosaria (Denis & Schiffermuller, 1775)
Ennomos fuscantaria (Haworth, 1809)
Ennomos quercaria (Hübner, 1813)
Ennomos quercinaria (Hufnagel, 1767)
Entephria caeruleata (Guenee, 1858)
Entephria caesiata (Denis & Schiffermuller, 1775)
Entephria cyanata (Hübner, 1809)
Entephria flavicinctata (Hübner, 1813)
Entephria nobiliaria (Herrich-Schäffer, 1852)
Epilobophora sabinata (Geyer, 1831)
Epione repandaria (Hufnagel, 1767)
Epione vespertaria (Linnaeus, 1767)
Epirrhoe alternata (Muller, 1764)
Epirrhoe galiata (Denis & Schiffermuller, 1775)
Epirrhoe molluginata (Hübner, 1813)
Epirrhoe rivata (Hübner, 1813)
Epirrhoe sandosaria (Herrich-Schäffer, 1852)
Epirrhoe tristata (Linnaeus, 1758)
Epirrita autumnata (Borkhausen, 1794)
Epirrita christyi (Allen, 1906)
Epirrita dilutata (Denis & Schiffermuller, 1775)
Erannis defoliaria (Clerck, 1759)
Euchoeca nebulata (Scopoli, 1763)
Eucrostes indigenata (de Villers, 1789)
Eulithis mellinata (Fabricius, 1787)
Eulithis populata (Linnaeus, 1758)
Eulithis prunata (Linnaeus, 1758)
Eulithis testata (Linnaeus, 1761)
Euphyia biangulata (Haworth, 1809)
Euphyia frustata (Treitschke, 1828)
Euphyia unangulata (Haworth, 1809)
Eupithecia abbreviata Stephens, 1831
Eupithecia absinthiata (Clerck, 1759)
Eupithecia alliaria Staudinger, 1870
Eupithecia assimilata Doubleday, 1856
Eupithecia breviculata (Donzel, 1837)
Eupithecia carpophagata Staudinger, 1871
Eupithecia cauchiata (Duponchel, 1831)
Eupithecia centaureata (Denis & Schiffermuller, 1775)
Eupithecia chalikophila Wehrli, 1926
Eupithecia cocciferata Milliere, 1864
Eupithecia cooptata Dietze, 1903
Eupithecia denotata (Hübner, 1813)
Eupithecia distinctaria Herrich-Schäffer, 1848
Eupithecia dodoneata Guenee, 1858
Eupithecia druentiata Dietze, 1902
Eupithecia egenaria Herrich-Schäffer, 1848
Eupithecia ericeata (Rambur, 1833)
Eupithecia extensaria (Freyer, 1844)
Eupithecia extraversaria Herrich-Schäffer, 1852
Eupithecia extremata (Fabricius, 1787)
Eupithecia gemellata Herrich-Schäffer, 1861
Eupithecia graphata (Treitschke, 1828)
Eupithecia gratiosata Herrich-Schäffer, 1861
Eupithecia gueneata Milliere, 1862
Eupithecia haworthiata Doubleday, 1856
Eupithecia icterata (de Villers, 1789)
Eupithecia immundata (Lienig, 1846)
Eupithecia impurata (Hübner, 1813)
Eupithecia indigata (Hübner, 1813)
Eupithecia innotata (Hufnagel, 1767)
Eupithecia intricata (Zetterstedt, 1839)
Eupithecia inturbata (Hübner, 1817)
Eupithecia irriguata (Hübner, 1813)
Eupithecia laquaearia Herrich-Schäffer, 1848
Eupithecia lariciata (Freyer, 1841)
Eupithecia liguriata Milliere, 1884
Eupithecia limbata Staudinger, 1879
Eupithecia linariata (Denis & Schiffermuller, 1775)
Eupithecia massiliata Milliere, 1865
Eupithecia millefoliata Rossler, 1866
Eupithecia minusculata Alphéraky, 1882
Eupithecia nanata (Hübner, 1813)
Eupithecia ochridata Schutze & Pinker, 1968
Eupithecia orana Dietze, 1913
Eupithecia orphnata W. Petersen, 1909
Eupithecia oxycedrata (Rambur, 1833)
Eupithecia pantellata Milliere, 1875
Eupithecia pauxillaria Boisduval, 1840
Eupithecia phoeniceata (Rambur, 1834)
Eupithecia pimpinellata (Hübner, 1813)
Eupithecia plumbeolata (Haworth, 1809)
Eupithecia praealta Wehrli, 1926
Eupithecia pulchellata Stephens, 1831
Eupithecia pusillata (Denis & Schiffermuller, 1775)
Eupithecia pyreneata Mabille, 1871
Eupithecia rosmarinata Dardoin & Milliere, 1865
Eupithecia santolinata Mabille, 1871
Eupithecia satyrata (Hübner, 1813)
Eupithecia schiefereri Bohatsch, 1893
Eupithecia scopariata (Rambur, 1833)
Eupithecia selinata Herrich-Schäffer, 1861
Eupithecia semigraphata Bruand, 1850
Eupithecia senorita Mironov, 2003
Eupithecia silenata Assmann, 1848
Eupithecia simpliciata (Haworth, 1809)
Eupithecia subfuscata (Haworth, 1809)
Eupithecia subumbrata (Denis & Schiffermuller, 1775)
Eupithecia succenturiata (Linnaeus, 1758)
Eupithecia tantillaria Boisduval, 1840
Eupithecia tenuiata (Hübner, 1813)
Eupithecia tripunctaria Herrich-Schäffer, 1852
Eupithecia trisignaria Herrich-Schäffer, 1848
Eupithecia ultimaria Boisduval, 1840
Eupithecia undata (Freyer, 1840)
Eupithecia unedonata Mabille, 1868
Eupithecia unitaria Herrich-Schäffer, 1852
Eupithecia variostrigata Alphéraky, 1876
Eupithecia venosata (Fabricius, 1787)
Eupithecia veratraria Herrich-Schäffer, 1848
Eupithecia virgaureata Doubleday, 1861
Eupithecia vulgata (Haworth, 1809)
Eupithecia weissi Prout, 1938
Eurranthis plummistaria (de Villers, 1789)
Eustroma reticulata (Denis & Schiffermuller, 1775)
Gagitodes sagittata (Fabricius, 1787)
Gandaritis pyraliata (Denis & Schiffermuller, 1775)
Geometra papilionaria (Linnaeus, 1758)
Glacies bentelii (Ratzer, 1890)
Glacies canaliculata (Hochenwarth, 1785)
Glacies coracina (Esper, 1805)
Gnopharmia stevenaria (Boisduval, 1840)
Gnophos furvata (Denis & Schiffermuller, 1775)
Gnophos obfuscata (Denis & Schiffermuller, 1775)
Gnophos dumetata Treitschke, 1827
Gnophos perspersata Treitschke, 1827
Gymnoscelis rufifasciata (Haworth, 1809)
Heliothea discoidaria Boisduval, 1840
Hemistola chrysoprasaria (Esper, 1795)
Hemithea aestivaria (Hübner, 1789)
Horisme aemulata (Hübner, 1813)
Horisme aquata (Hübner, 1813)
Horisme calligraphata (Herrich-Schäffer, 1838)
Horisme radicaria (de La Harpe, 1855)
Horisme scorteata (Staudinger, 1901)
Horisme tersata (Denis & Schiffermuller, 1775)
Horisme vitalbata (Denis & Schiffermuller, 1775)
Hospitalia flavolineata (Staudinger, 1883)
Hydrelia flammeolaria (Hufnagel, 1767)
Hydrelia sylvata (Denis & Schiffermuller, 1775)
Hydria andalusica (Ribbe, 1912)
Hydria cervinalis (Scopoli, 1763)
Hydria gudarica (Dufay, 1983)
Hydria ithys (Prout, 1937)
Hydria montivagata (Duponchel, 1830)
Hydria undulata (Linnaeus, 1758)
Hydriomena furcata (Thunberg, 1784)
Hydriomena impluviata (Denis & Schiffermuller, 1775)
Hydriomena ruberata (Freyer, 1831)
Hylaea fasciaria (Linnaeus, 1758)
Hypomecis punctinalis (Scopoli, 1763)
Hypomecis roboraria (Denis & Schiffermuller, 1775)
Idaea acutipennis Hausmann & Honey, 2004
Idaea albarracina (Reisser, 1934)
Idaea alicantaria (Reisser, 1963)
Idaea alyssumata (Milliere, 1871)
Idaea attenuaria (Rambur, 1833)
Idaea aureolaria (Denis & Schiffermuller, 1775)
Idaea aversata (Linnaeus, 1758)
Idaea belemiata (Milliere, 1868)
Idaea bigladiata Herbulot, 1975
Idaea biselata (Hufnagel, 1767)
Idaea blaesii Lenz & Hausmann, 1992
Idaea calunetaria (Staudinger, 1859)
Idaea camparia (Herrich-Schäffer, 1852)
Idaea carvalhoi Herbulot, 1979
Idaea cervantaria (Milliere, 1869)
Idaea circuitaria (Hübner, 1819)
Idaea completa (Staudinger, 1892)
Idaea consanguiberica Rezbanyai-Reser & Exposito, 1992
Idaea contiguaria (Hübner, 1799)
Idaea davidi Gaston & Redondo, 2005
Idaea degeneraria (Hübner, 1799)
Idaea deitanaria Reisser & Weisert, 1977
Idaea deversaria (Herrich-Schäffer, 1847)
Idaea dilutaria (Hübner, 1799)
Idaea dimidiata (Hufnagel, 1767)
Idaea distinctaria (Boisduval, 1840)
Idaea dromikos Hausmann, 2004
Idaea efflorata Zeller, 1849
Idaea elongaria (Rambur, 1833)
Idaea emarginata (Linnaeus, 1758)
Idaea eugeniata (Dardoin & Milliere, 1870)
Idaea exilaria (Guenee, 1858)
Idaea figuraria (Bang-Haas, 1907)
Idaea filicata (Hübner, 1799)
Idaea flaveolaria (Hübner, 1809)
Idaea fractilineata (Zeller, 1847)
Idaea fuscovenosa (Goeze, 1781)
Idaea humiliata (Hufnagel, 1767)
Idaea ibizaria von Mentzer, 1980
Idaea incalcarata (Chretien, 1913)
Idaea incisaria (Staudinger, 1892)
Idaea infirmaria (Rambur, 1833)
Idaea inquinata (Scopoli, 1763)
Idaea joannisiata (Homberg, 1911)
Idaea korbi (Pungeler, 1917)
Idaea laevigata (Scopoli, 1763)
Idaea lambessata (Oberthur, 1887)
Idaea litigiosaria (Boisduval, 1840)
Idaea longaria (Herrich-Schäffer, 1852)
Idaea lusohispanica Herbulot, 1991
Idaea luteolaria (Constant, 1863)
Idaea lutulentaria (Staudinger, 1892)
Idaea macilentaria (Herrich-Schäffer, 1847)
Idaea mancipiata (Staudinger, 1871)
Idaea manicaria (Herrich-Schäffer, 1852)
Idaea mediaria (Hübner, 1819)
Idaea minuscularia (Ribbe, 1912)
Idaea moniliata (Denis & Schiffermuller, 1775)
Idaea muricata (Hufnagel, 1767)
Idaea mustelata (Gumppenberg, 1892)
Idaea nevadata (Wehrli, 1926)
Idaea nexata (Hübner, 1813)
Idaea nigrolineata (Chretien, 1911)
Idaea obsoletaria (Rambur, 1833)
Idaea ochrata (Scopoli, 1763)
Idaea ostrinaria (Hübner, 1813)
Idaea politaria (Hübner, 1799)
Idaea praecisa (Reisser, 1934)
Idaea predotaria (Hartig, 1951)
Idaea rainerii Hausmann, 1994
Idaea rhodogrammaria (Pungeler, 1913)
Idaea robiginata (Staudinger, 1863)
Idaea rubraria (Staudinger, 1901)
Idaea rufaria (Hübner, 1799)
Idaea rupicolaria (Reisser, 1927)
Idaea rusticata (Denis & Schiffermuller, 1775)
Idaea saleri Dominguez & Baixeras, 1992
Idaea sardoniata (Homberg, 1912)
Idaea seriata (Schrank, 1802)
Idaea sericeata (Hübner, 1813)
Idaea serpentata (Hufnagel, 1767)
Idaea simplicior (Prout, 1934)
Idaea squalidaria (Staudinger, 1882)
Idaea straminata (Borkhausen, 1794)
Idaea subsaturata (Guenee, 1858)
Idaea subsericeata (Haworth, 1809)
Idaea sylvestraria (Hübner, 1799)
Idaea trigeminata (Haworth, 1809)
Idaea urcitana (Agenjo, 1952)
Isturgia catalaunaria (Guenee, 1858)
Isturgia famula (Esper, 1787)
Isturgia limbaria (Fabricius, 1775)
Isturgia miniosaria (Duponchel, 1829)
Isturgia murinaria (Denis & Schiffermuller, 1775)
Isturgia pulinda (Walker, 1860)
Isturgia spodiaria (Lefebvre, 1832)
Itame vincularia (Hübner, 1813)
Jodis lactearia (Linnaeus, 1758)
Kuchleria insignata Hausmann, 1994
Lampropteryx otregiata (Metcalfe, 1917)
Lampropteryx suffumata (Denis & Schiffermuller, 1775)
Larentia clavaria (Haworth, 1809)
Larentia malvata (Rambur, 1833)
Ligdia adustata (Denis & Schiffermuller, 1775)
Lithostege castiliaria Staudinger, 1877
Lithostege cinerata Turati, 1924
Lithostege clarae Gaston & Redondo, 2004
Lithostege duponcheli Prout, 1938
Lithostege griseata (Denis & Schiffermuller, 1775)
Lobophora halterata (Hufnagel, 1767)
Lomaspilis marginata (Linnaeus, 1758)
Lomographa bimaculata (Fabricius, 1775)
Lomographa temerata (Denis & Schiffermuller, 1775)
Lycia hirtaria (Clerck, 1759)
Lycia zonaria (Denis & Schiffermuller, 1775)
Lythria purpuraria (Linnaeus, 1758)
Lythria sanguinaria (Duponchel, 1842)
Macaria alternata (Denis & Schiffermuller, 1775)
Macaria artesiaria (Denis & Schiffermuller, 1775)
Macaria brunneata (Thunberg, 1784)
Macaria liturata (Clerck, 1759)
Macaria notata (Linnaeus, 1758)
Macaria wauaria (Linnaeus, 1758)
Melanthia procellata (Denis & Schiffermuller, 1775)
Menophra abruptaria (Thunberg, 1792)
Menophra annegreteae Skou, 2007
Menophra harterti (Rothschild, 1912)
Menophra japygiaria (O. Costa, 1849)
Menophra nycthemeraria (Geyer, 1831)
Mesoleuca albicillata (Linnaeus, 1758)
Mesotype didymata (Linnaeus, 1758)
Mesotype verberata (Scopoli, 1763)
Microloxia herbaria (Hübner, 1813)
Minoa murinata (Scopoli, 1763)
Myinodes constantina Hausmann, 1994
Myinodes interpunctaria (Herrich-Schäffer, 1839)
Narraga isabel Agenjo, 1956
Narraga nelvae (Rothschild, 1912)
Nebula achromaria (de La Harpe, 1853)
Nebula ibericata (Staudinger, 1871)
Nebula nebulata (Treitschke, 1828)
Nebula numidiata (Staudinger, 1892)
Nychiodes andalusiaria Staudinger, 1892
Nychiodes hispanica Wehrli, 1929
Nychiodes notarioi Exposito Hermosa, 2005
Nycterosea obstipata (Fabricius, 1794)
Oar reaumuraria (Milliere, 1864)
Odezia atrata (Linnaeus, 1758)
Odontopera bidentata (Clerck, 1759)
Onychora agaritharia (Dardoin, 1842)
Operophtera brumata (Linnaeus, 1758)
Operophtera fagata (Scharfenberg, 1805)
Opisthograptis luteolata (Linnaeus, 1758)
Oulobophora internata (Pungeler, 1888)
Ourapteryx sambucaria (Linnaeus, 1758)
Pachycnemia hippocastanaria (Hübner, 1799)
Pachycnemia tibiaria (Rambur, 1829)
Paradarisa consonaria (Hübner, 1799)
Parectropis similaria (Hufnagel, 1767)
Pareulype berberata (Denis & Schiffermuller, 1775)
Pareulype lasithiotica (Rebel, 1906)
Pasiphila debiliata (Hübner, 1817)
Pasiphila rectangulata (Linnaeus, 1758)
Pelurga comitata (Linnaeus, 1758)
Pennithera firmata (Hübner, 1822)
Pennithera ulicata (Rambur, 1934)
Perconia baeticaria (Staudinger, 1871)
Perconia strigillaria (Hübner, 1787)
Peribatodes abstersaria (Boisduval, 1840)
Peribatodes ilicaria (Geyer, 1833)
Peribatodes perversaria (Boisduval, 1840)
Peribatodes powelli (Oberthur, 1913)
Peribatodes rhomboidaria (Denis & Schiffermuller, 1775)
Peribatodes secundaria (Denis & Schiffermuller, 1775)
Peribatodes subflavaria (Milliere, 1876)
Peribatodes umbraria (Hübner, 1809)
Perizoma affinitata (Stephens, 1831)
Perizoma albulata (Denis & Schiffermuller, 1775)
Perizoma alchemillata (Linnaeus, 1758)
Perizoma bifaciata (Haworth, 1809)
Perizoma blandiata (Denis & Schiffermuller, 1775)
Perizoma flavofasciata (Thunberg, 1792)
Perizoma flavosparsata (Wagner, 1926)
Perizoma hydrata (Treitschke, 1829)
Perizoma incultaria (Herrich-Schäffer, 1848)
Perizoma lugdunaria (Herrich-Schäffer, 1855)
Perizoma minorata (Treitschke, 1828)
Perizoma obsoletata (Herrich-Schäffer, 1838)
Petrophora binaevata (Mabille, 1869)
Petrophora chlorosata (Scopoli, 1763)
Petrophora convergata (de Villers, 1789)
Petrophora narbonea (Linnaeus, 1767)
Phaiogramma etruscaria (Zeller, 1849)
Phaiogramma faustinata (Milliere, 1868)
Phaselia algiricaria Oberthur, 1913
Phibalapteryx virgata (Hufnagel, 1767)
Phigalia pilosaria (Denis & Schiffermuller, 1775)
Philereme transversata (Hufnagel, 1767)
Philereme vetulata (Denis & Schiffermuller, 1775)
Pingasa lahayei (Oberthur, 1887)
Plagodis dolabraria (Linnaeus, 1767)
Plagodis pulveraria (Linnaeus, 1758)
Plemyria rubiginata (Denis & Schiffermuller, 1775)
Protorhoe corollaria (Herrich-Schäffer, 1848)
Pseudopanthera macularia (Linnaeus, 1758)
Pseudoterpna coronillaria (Hübner, 1817)
Pseudoterpna pruinata (Hufnagel, 1767)
Psodos quadrifaria (Sulzer, 1776)
Pterapherapteryx sexalata (Retzius, 1783)
Pungeleria capreolaria (Denis & Schiffermuller, 1775)
Rheumaptera hastata (Linnaeus, 1758)
Rhodometra sacraria (Linnaeus, 1767)
Rhodostrophia calabra (Petagna, 1786)
Rhodostrophia pudorata (Fabricius, 1794)
Rhodostrophia vibicaria (Clerck, 1759)
Rhoptria asperaria (Hübner, 1817)
Sardocyrnia fortunaria (Vazquez, 1905)
Sciadia tenebraria (Esper, 1806)
Scopula asellaria (Herrich-Schäffer, 1847)
Scopula confinaria (Herrich-Schäffer, 1847)
Scopula decolor (Staudinger, 1898)
Scopula emutaria (Hübner, 1809)
Scopula floslactata (Haworth, 1809)
Scopula imitaria (Hübner, 1799)
Scopula immutata (Linnaeus, 1758)
Scopula incanata (Linnaeus, 1758)
Scopula marginepunctata (Goeze, 1781)
Scopula minorata (Boisduval, 1833)
Scopula rubellata (Gumppenberg, 1892)
Scopula rufomixtaria (de Graslin, 1863)
Scopula subpunctaria (Herrich-Schäffer, 1847)
Scopula ternata Schrank, 1802
Scopula caricaria (Reutti, 1853)
Scopula concinnaria (Duponchel, 1842)
Scopula decorata (Denis & Schiffermuller, 1775)
Scopula immorata (Linnaeus, 1758)
Scopula nigropunctata (Hufnagel, 1767)
Scopula ornata (Scopoli, 1763)
Scopula rubiginata (Hufnagel, 1767)
Scopula submutata (Treitschke, 1828)
Scopula tessellaria (Boisduval, 1840)
Scopula turbidaria (Hübner, 1819)
Scopula virgulata (Denis & Schiffermuller, 1775)
Scotopteryx alfacaria (Staudinger, 1859)
Scotopteryx angularia (de Villers, 1789)
Scotopteryx bipunctaria (Denis & Schiffermuller, 1775)
Scotopteryx chenopodiata (Linnaeus, 1758)
Scotopteryx coarctaria (Denis & Schiffermuller, 1775)
Scotopteryx coelinaria (de Graslin, 1863)
Scotopteryx luridata (Hufnagel, 1767)
Scotopteryx moeniata (Scopoli, 1763)
Scotopteryx mucronata (Scopoli, 1763)
Scotopteryx octodurensis (Favre, 1903)
Scotopteryx peribolata (Hübner, 1817)
Selenia dentaria (Fabricius, 1775)
Selenia lunularia (Hübner, 1788)
Selenia tetralunaria (Hufnagel, 1767)
Selidosema brunnearia (de Villers, 1789)
Selidosema plumaria (Denis & Schiffermuller, 1775)
Selidosema taeniolaria (Hübner, 1813)
Siona lineata (Scopoli, 1763)
Spargania luctuata (Denis & Schiffermuller, 1775)
Stegania cararia (Hübner, 1790)
Stegania trimaculata (de Villers, 1789)
Synopsia sociaria (Hübner, 1799)
Tephronia codetaria (Oberthur, 1881)
Tephronia espaniola (Schawerda, 1931)
Tephronia gracilaria (Boisduval, 1840)
Tephronia oranaria Staudinger, 1892
Tephronia sepiaria (Hufnagel, 1767)
Thalera fimbrialis (Scopoli, 1763)
Thera britannica (Turner, 1925)
Thera cognata (Thunberg, 1792)
Thera cupressata (Geyer, 1831)
Thera juniperata (Linnaeus, 1758)
Thera obeliscata (Hübner, 1787)
Thera variata (Denis & Schiffermuller, 1775)
Thera vetustata (Denis & Schiffermuller, 1775)
Theria primaria (Haworth, 1809)
Thetidia smaragdaria (Fabricius, 1787)
Thetidia plusiaria Boisduval, 1840
Timandra comae Schmidt, 1931
Timandra griseata Petersen, 1902
Toulgoetia cauteriata (Staudinger, 1859)
Trichopteryx carpinata (Borkhausen, 1794)
Trichopteryx polycommata (Denis & Schiffermuller, 1775)
Triphosa dubitata (Linnaeus, 1758)
Triphosa sabaudiata (Duponchel, 1830)
Triphosa tauteli Leraut, 2008
Venusia cambrica Curtis, 1839
Xanthorhoe biriviata (Borkhausen, 1794)
Xanthorhoe decoloraria (Esper, 1806)
Xanthorhoe designata (Hufnagel, 1767)
Xanthorhoe disjunctaria (de La Harpe, 1860)
Xanthorhoe ferrugata (Clerck, 1759)
Xanthorhoe fluctuata (Linnaeus, 1758)
Xanthorhoe montanata (Denis & Schiffermuller, 1775)
Xanthorhoe quadrifasiata (Clerck, 1759)
Xanthorhoe skoui Viidalepp & Hausmann, 2004
Xanthorhoe spadicearia (Denis & Schiffermuller, 1775)
Xenochlorodes olympiaria (Herrich-Schäffer, 1852)
Zernyia granataria (Staudinger, 1871)

Glyphipterigidae
Acrolepia autumnitella Curtis, 1838
Acrolepiopsis assectella (Zeller, 1839)
Acrolepiopsis marcidella (Curtis, 1850)
Acrolepiopsis vesperella (Zeller, 1850)
Digitivalva eglanteriella (Mann, 1855)
Digitivalva pappella (Walsingham, 1908)
Digitivalva reticulella (Hübner, 1796)
Digitivalva granitella (Treitschke, 1833)
Digitivalva occidentella (Klimesch, 1956)
Digitivalva pulicariae (Klimesch, 1956)
Digitivalva solidaginis (Staudinger, 1859)
Glyphipterix bergstraesserella (Fabricius, 1781)
Glyphipterix equitella (Scopoli, 1763)
Glyphipterix forsterella (Fabricius, 1781)
Glyphipterix fuscoviridella (Haworth, 1828)
Glyphipterix gianelliella Ragonot, 1885
Glyphipterix haworthana (Stephens, 1834)
Glyphipterix schoenicolella Boyd, 1859
Glyphipterix simpliciella (Stephens, 1834)
Glyphipterix thrasonella (Scopoli, 1763)
Glyphipterix umbilici M. Hering, 1927
Orthotelia sparganella (Thunberg, 1788)

Gracillariidae
Acrocercops brongniardella (Fabricius, 1798)
Acrocercops cocciferellum (Chretien, 1910)
Aspilapteryx limosella (Duponchel, 1843)
Aspilapteryx multipunctella Chretien, 1916
Aspilapteryx tringipennella (Zeller, 1839)
Callisto denticulella (Thunberg, 1794)
Caloptilia alchimiella (Scopoli, 1763)
Caloptilia azaleella (Brants, 1913)
Caloptilia coruscans (Walsingham, 1907)
Caloptilia cuculipennella (Hübner, 1796)
Caloptilia elongella (Linnaeus, 1761)
Caloptilia falconipennella (Hübner, 1813)
Caloptilia fidella (Reutti, 1853)
Caloptilia fribergensis (Fritzsche, 1871)
Caloptilia hemidactylella (Denis & Schiffermuller, 1775)
Caloptilia populetorum (Zeller, 1839)
Caloptilia robustella Jackh, 1972
Caloptilia roscipennella (Hübner, 1796)
Caloptilia rufipennella (Hübner, 1796)
Caloptilia stigmatella (Fabricius, 1781)
Calybites phasianipennella (Hübner, 1813)
Cameraria ohridella Deschka & Dimic, 1986
Dextellia dorsilineella (Amsel, 1935)
Dialectica scalariella (Zeller, 1850)
Euspilapteryx auroguttella Stephens, 1835
Gracillaria syringella (Fabricius, 1794)
Leucospilapteryx omissella (Stainton, 1848)
Metriochroa latifoliella (Milliere, 1886)
Micrurapteryx gradatella (Herrich-Schäffer, 1855)
Micrurapteryx kollariella (Zeller, 1839)
Parectopa ononidis (Zeller, 1839)
Parornix anglicella (Stainton, 1850)
Parornix incerta Triberti, 1982
Parornix scoticella (Stainton, 1850)
Parornix szocsi Gozmany, 1952
Parornix tenella (Rebel, 1919)
Parornix torquillella (Zeller, 1850)
Phyllocnistis citrella Stainton, 1856
Phyllocnistis labyrinthella (Bjerkander, 1790)
Phyllocnistis ramulicola Langmaid & Corley, 2007
Phyllocnistis saligna (Zeller, 1839)
Phyllocnistis unipunctella (Stephens, 1834)
Phyllocnistis valentinensis M. Hering, 1936
Phyllocnistis xenia M. Hering, 1936
Phyllonorycter adenocarpi (Staudinger, 1863)
Phyllonorycter alnivorella (Ragonot, 1875)
Phyllonorycter andalusicus A. & Z. Lastuvka, 2006
Phyllonorycter aroniae (M. Hering, 1936)
Phyllonorycter baetica A. & Z. Lastuvka, 2006
Phyllonorycter barbarella (Rebel, 1901)
Phyllonorycter belotella (Staudinger, 1859)
Phyllonorycter blancardella (Fabricius, 1781)
Phyllonorycter cerasicolella (Herrich-Schäffer, 1855)
Phyllonorycter cerasinella (Reutti, 1852)
Phyllonorycter chiclanella (Staudinger, 1859)
Phyllonorycter chrysella (Constant, 1885)
Phyllonorycter cocciferella (Mendes, 1910)
Phyllonorycter comparella (Duponchel, 1843)
Phyllonorycter coryli (Nicelli, 1851)
Phyllonorycter corylifoliella (Hübner, 1796)
Phyllonorycter delitella (Duponchel, 1843)
Phyllonorycter deschkanus A. & Z. Lastuvka, 2006
Phyllonorycter distentella (Zeller, 1846)
Phyllonorycter echinosparti A. & Z. Lastuvka, 2006
Phyllonorycter endryella (Mann, 1855)
Phyllonorycter erinaceae Lastuvka & Lastuvka, 2013
Phyllonorycter estrela A. & Z. Lastuvka, 2006
Phyllonorycter froelichiella (Zeller, 1839)
Phyllonorycter genistella (Rebel, 1900)
Phyllonorycter haasi (Rebel, 1901)
Phyllonorycter harrisella (Linnaeus, 1761)
Phyllonorycter helianthemella (Herrich-Schäffer, 1861)
Phyllonorycter hesperiella (Staudinger, 1859)
Phyllonorycter hilarella (Zetterstedt, 1839)
Phyllonorycter ilicifoliella (Duponchel, 1843)
Phyllonorycter insignitella (Zeller, 1846)
Phyllonorycter kautziella (Hartig, 1938)
Phyllonorycter klemannella (Fabricius, 1781)
Phyllonorycter kuhlweiniella (Zeller, 1839)
Phyllonorycter kusdasi Deschka, 1970
Phyllonorycter lantanella (Schrank, 1802)
Phyllonorycter lautella (Zeller, 1846)
Phyllonorycter maestingella (Muller, 1764)
Phyllonorycter mespilella (Hübner, 1805)
Phyllonorycter messaniella (Zeller, 1846)
Phyllonorycter millierella (Staudinger, 1871)
Phyllonorycter monspessulanella (Fuchs, 1897)
Phyllonorycter nevadensis Walsingham, 1908
Phyllonorycter nicellii (Stainton, 1851)
Phyllonorycter nigrescentella (Logan, 1851)
Phyllonorycter oxyacanthae (Frey, 1856)
Phyllonorycter parvifoliella (Ragonot, 1875)
Phyllonorycter pastorella (Zeller, 1846)
Phyllonorycter phyllocytisi (M. Hering, 1936)
Phyllonorycter platani (Staudinger, 1870)
Phyllonorycter populifoliella (Treitschke, 1833)
Phyllonorycter pumila A. & Z. Lastuvka, 2006
Phyllonorycter purgantella (Chretien, 1915)
Phyllonorycter quercifoliella (Zeller, 1839)
Phyllonorycter rebimbasi (Mendes, 1910)
Phyllonorycter robiniella (Clemens, 1859)
Phyllonorycter roboris (Zeller, 1839)
Phyllonorycter salicicolella (Sircom, 1848)
Phyllonorycter salictella (Zeller, 1846)
Phyllonorycter scabiosella (Douglas, 1853)
Phyllonorycter schreberella (Fabricius, 1781)
Phyllonorycter scitulella (Duponchel, 1843)
Phyllonorycter scopariella (Zeller, 1846)
Phyllonorycter scorpius A. & Z. Lastuvka, 2006
Phyllonorycter sorbi (Frey, 1855)
Phyllonorycter spartocytisi (M. Hering, 1927)
Phyllonorycter spinicolella (Zeller, 1846)
Phyllonorycter suberifoliella (Zeller, 1850)
Phyllonorycter telinella A. & Z. Lastuvka, 2006
Phyllonorycter tridentatae A. & Z. Lastuvka, 2006
Phyllonorycter trifasciella (Haworth, 1828)
Phyllonorycter triflorella (Peyerimhoff, 1872)
Phyllonorycter ulicicolella (Stainton, 1851)
Phyllonorycter vueltas A. & Z. Lastuvka, 2006
Povolnya leucapennella (Stephens, 1835)
Spulerina simploniella (Fischer von Röslerstamm, 1840)

Heliodinidae
Heliodines roesella (Linnaeus, 1758)
Antispila treitschkiella (Fischer von Röslerstamm, 1843)
Heliozela sericiella (Haworth, 1828)
Holocacista rivillei (Stainton, 1855)

Hepialidae
Hepialus humuli (Linnaeus, 1758)
Pharmacis castillanus (Oberthur, 1883)
Pharmacis fusconebulosa (DeGeer, 1778)
Pharmacis lupulina (Linnaeus, 1758)
Pharmacis pyrenaicus (Donzel, 1838)
Triodia sylvina (Linnaeus, 1761)

Heterogynidae
Heterogynis andalusica Daniel, 1966
Heterogynis canalensis Chapman, 1904
Heterogynis paradoxa Rambur, 1837
Heterogynis penella (Hübner, 1819)

Incurvariidae
Crinopteryx familiella Peyerimhoff, 1871
Incurvaria koerneriella (Zeller, 1839)
Incurvaria masculella (Denis & Schiffermuller, 1775)
Incurvaria oehlmanniella (Hübner, 1796)
Incurvaria pectinea Haworth, 1828

Lasiocampidae
Chondrostega vandalicia (Milliere, 1865)
Dendrolimus pini (Linnaeus, 1758)
Eriogaster catax (Linnaeus, 1758)
Eriogaster lanestris (Linnaeus, 1758)
Eriogaster rimicola (Denis & Schiffermuller, 1775)
Euthrix potatoria (Linnaeus, 1758)
Gastropacha quercifolia (Linnaeus, 1758)
Gastropacha populifolia (Denis & Schiffermuller, 1775)
Lasiocampa quercus (Linnaeus, 1758)
Lasiocampa serrula (Guenee, 1858)
Lasiocampa trifolii (Denis & Schiffermuller, 1775)
Macrothylacia digramma Meade-Waldo, 1905
Macrothylacia rubi (Linnaeus, 1758)
Malacosoma castrensis (Linnaeus, 1758)
Malacosoma neustria (Linnaeus, 1758)
Malacosoma alpicola Staudinger, 1870
Malacosoma franconica (Denis & Schiffermuller, 1775)
Malacosoma laurae Lajonquiere, 1977
Odonestis pruni (Linnaeus, 1758)
Pachypasa limosa (de Villiers, 1827)
Phyllodesma suberifolia (Duponchel, 1842)
Phyllodesma ilicifolia (Linnaeus, 1758)
Phyllodesma kermesifolia (Lajonquiere, 1960)
Phyllodesma tremulifolia (Hübner, 1810)
Poecilocampa alpina (Frey & Wullschlegel, 1874)
Poecilocampa populi (Linnaeus, 1758)
Psilogaster loti (Ochsenheimer, 1810)
Streblote panda Hübner, 1820
Trichiura ilicis (Rambur, 1866)
Trichiura castiliana Spuler, 1908
Trichiura crataegi (Linnaeus, 1758)

Lecithoceridae
Eurodachtha canigella (Caradja, 1920)
Eurodachtha flavissimella (Mann, 1862)
Eurodachtha pallicornella (Staudinger, 1859)
Eurodachtha siculella (Wocke, 1889)
Homaloxestis briantiella (Turati, 1879)
Lecithocera nigrana (Duponchel, 1836)
Odites kollarella (O. G. Costa, 1832)
Odites ternatella (Staudinger, 1859)

Limacodidae
Apoda limacodes (Hufnagel, 1766)
Heterogenea asella (Denis & Schiffermuller, 1775)
Hoyosia codeti (Oberthur, 1883)

Lyonetiidae
Leucoptera aceris (Fuchs, 1903)
Leucoptera adenocarpella (Staudinger, 1871)
Leucoptera andalusica Mey, 1994
Leucoptera astragali Mey & Corley, 1999
Leucoptera coronillae (M. Hering, 1933)
Leucoptera laburnella (Stainton, 1851)
Leucoptera lotella (Stainton, 1859)
Leucoptera malifoliella (O. Costa, 1836)
Leucoptera sinuella (Reutti, 1853)
Leucoptera spartifoliella (Hübner, 1813)
Lyonetia clerkella (Linnaeus, 1758)
Phyllobrostis daphneella Staudinger, 1859
Phyllobrostis eremitella de Joannis, 1912
Phyllobrostis fregenella Hartig, 1941
Phyllobrostis jedmella Chretien, 1907

Lypusidae
Amphisbatis incongruella (Stainton, 1849)
Pseudatemelia amparoella Vives, 1986
Pseudatemelia detrimentella (Staudinger, 1859)
Pseudatemelia filiella (Staudinger, 1859)
Pseudatemelia flavifrontella (Denis & Schiffermuller, 1775)
Pseudatemelia subochreella (Doubleday, 1859)
Pseudatemelia xanthosoma (Rebel, 1900)
Pseudatemelia josephinae (Toll, 1956)

Micropterigidae
Micropterix aglaella (Duponchel, 1838)
Micropterix aruncella (Scopoli, 1763)
Micropterix granatensis Heath, 1981
Micropterix herminiella Corley, 2007
Micropterix ibericella Caradja, 1920
Micropterix imperfectella Staudinger, 1859
Micropterix minimella Heath, 1973
Micropterix sicanella Zeller, 1847
Micropterix stuebneri Zeller, Werno & Kurz, 2013
Micropterix tunbergella (Fabricius, 1787)

Millieridae
Millieria dolosalis (Heydenreich, 1851)

Momphidae
Mompha langiella (Hübner, 1796)
Mompha miscella (Denis & Schiffermuller, 1775)
Mompha divisella Herrich-Schäffer, 1854
Mompha epilobiella (Denis & Schiffermuller, 1775)
Mompha jurassicella (Frey, 1881)
Mompha lacteella (Stephens, 1834)
Mompha ochraceella (Curtis, 1839)
Mompha propinquella (Stainton, 1851)
Mompha subbistrigella (Haworth, 1828)
Mompha locupletella (Denis & Schiffermuller, 1775)
Mompha terminella (Humphreys & Westwood, 1845)
Urodeta hibernella (Staudinger, 1859)

See also
List of Iberian butterflies

External links
Fauna Europaea

Iberia
Iberia G
Moths
Moths
Moths